The Ages of Three Children puzzle is a logic puzzle which on first inspection seems to have insufficient information to solve, but which rewards those who persist and examine the puzzle critically.

The puzzle
A census taker approaches a woman leaning on her gate and asks about her children. She says, "I have three children and the product of their ages is seventy–two. The sum of their ages is the number on this gate." The census taker does some calculation and claims not to have enough information. The woman enters her house, but before slamming the door tells the census taker, "I have to see to my eldest child who is in bed with measles." The census taker departs, satisfied.

The problem can be presented in different ways, giving the same basic information: the product, that the sum is known, and that there is an oldest child (e.g. their ages adding up to today's date, or the eldest being good at chess).

Another version of the puzzle gives the age product as thirty–six, which leads to a different set of ages for the children.

Solutions

for 72 
The prime factors of 72 are 2, 2, 2, 3, 3; in other words, 

This gives the following triplets of possible solutions;

Because the census taker knew the total (from the number on the gate) but said that he had insufficient information to give a definitive answer, there must be more than one solution with the same total.

Only two sets of possible ages add up to the same totals:

A. 

B. 

In case 'A', there is no 'eldest child': two children are aged six (although one could be a few minutes or around 9 to 12 months older and they still both be 6). Therefore, when told that one child is the eldest, the census-taker concludes that the correct solution is 'B'.

for 36 
The prime factors of 36 are 2, 2, 3, 3
This gives the following triplets of possible solutions;

Using the same argument as before it becomes clear that the number on the gate is 13, and the ages 9, 2 and 2.

References

Logic puzzles